Melongena patula, common name Pacific crown conch, is a species of large sea snail, a marine gastropod mollusk in the family Melongenidae.

Description
Melongena patula has a shell that reaches a length of 75 – 250 mm. The surface of this shell shows a deep chestnut brown color lined with a few white or yellow spiral bands. The interior is white. The shell is quite slender, sometimes spiny on the shoulders, with a wide aperture.

Distribution
This species can be found from the Gulf of California (Mexico) to Peru.

Habitat
These sea snails live in shallow water, usually in sandy or muddy areas, especially under mangrove trees.

References

External links
 C. Bayer Catalogue of the genera Melanogena and Semifusus
 WoRMS
 
 Discover Life
 Image of a live snail of this species

Melongenidae
Gastropods described in 1844